Nagambie Lakes is a subregion of the Goulburn Valley wine region in the Australian state of Victoria. Lake Nagambie on the Goulburn River is the largest waterbody in the region, and Nagambie is the main town.

The first vineyards and winery were established in the area in 1860. Tahbilk was the original winery, and still produces some wine from vines planted in the 1860s. Mitchelton Wines is another significant winery, established in 1969.

The key varieties in the region include shiraz, chardonnay, cabernet sauvignon, sauvignon blanc, marsanne and merlot. Slightly more red than white wine is produced. The soil is rich in iron oxide, and is both well-draining and moisture-retentive.

References

Wine regions of Victoria (Australia)